Figure skating was featured as part of the 2007 Asian Winter Games at the Changchun Wuhuan Gymnasium in Changchun, China. Events were held from 1 February to 3 February 2007. Skaters competed in four disciplines: men's singles, ladies singles, pairs, and ice dance.

Schedule

Medalists

Medal table

Participating nations
A total of 46 athletes from 9 nations competed in figure skating at the 2007 Asian Winter Games:

References

 Results

External links
 Results

 
2007 Asian Winter Games events
2007
Asian Winter Games
International figure skating competitions hosted by China